Ramon Torralba Larraz (13 August 1895 – 6 June 1986) is a famous figure in the history of FC Barcelona. He was popularly known as la Vella ('the Old One') because of his long career with Barça.

Club career
Despite being born in Aragon, he moved to Catalonia at just six months old, and there he began playing football at FC International in 1912, before joining Barcelona two years later, with whom he played for the next 15 seasons, earning the nickname 'la Vella' (the Old One).

He played as a holding midfield and was known for his strength and sacrifices. He formed a partnership with Agustín Sancho and Josep Samitier on the midfield. He was a regular in the starting line-ups from the 1914/15 season until the 1925/26 season. With Barcelona he won 10 Catalan championships, along with four Copa del Rey titles in 1920, 1922, 1925 and 1926, with Torralba scoring the opening goal in the 1922 final which ended in a 5-1 win over Real Unión.

On 4 February 1917, he become the first player in the history of Barcelona to be granted a testimonial match, which took place at the Camp de la Indústria when he was still an active player. He retired on 1 July 1928, at the Camp de Les Corts, after a second tribute match.

Honours

Club
Barcelona

Catalan football championship:
Champions (10): 1915-16, 1918-19, 1919-20, 1920-21, 1921-22, 1923–24, 1924–25, 1925–26, 1926–27 and in 1927–28

Copa del Rey:
Champions (4): 1920, 1922, 1925 and 1926

References

FC Barcelona players
1895 births
1986 deaths
People from Cinco Villas, Aragon
Sportspeople from the Province of Zaragoza
Association football midfielders
Spanish footballers
Footballers from Aragon
Footballers from Catalonia
Catalonia international footballers